Janie Lou Gibbs (née Hickox; December 25, 1932 – February 7, 2010) was an American serial killer from Cordele, Georgia, who killed her three sons, a grandson, and her husband, by poisoning them with arsenic in 1966 and 1967.

Background
Gibbs was born in Georgia on Christmas Day, 1932. She operated a daycare from her home and was a dedicated member of the local church community. She had been married to her husband Marvin for 18 years before she began killing.

Murders
In 1965, Gibbs committed her first murder, poisoning her husband Marvin by putting arsenic into his dinner. While he was in hospital, she brought him homemade soup containing more poison. After Marvin's death on January 21, 1966, doctors decided the cause of death had been a liver disease. After her husband's death, Gibbs was supported by the local church community. She later donated some of her husband's life insurance money to the church.

Eight months after the death of Gibbs's husband, she poisoned her youngest son, 13-year-old Marvin. He died on August 29, 1966. He was assumed to have inherited a liver disease from his father, but his death certificate listed hepatitis. Gibbs was not suspected of any wrongdoing, and she again donated a large portion of her life insurance payout to the local church. On January 23, 1967, another one of Gibbs's sons, 16-year-old Melvin, died suddenly. Doctors listed his cause of death as a rare muscular disorder, and for a third time, Gibbs donated life insurance money to the church.

Gibbs now had only one son left, 19-year-old Robert. Robert had fathered a child named Raymond with his wife, and Gibbs was seen to be delighted that she had become a grandmother. Soon, Raymond became sick and died suddenly, followed only a month later by his father. Following the sudden deaths of a previously healthy young man and his infant son, the family physician became suspicious and referred the case to the state crime lab.

Aftermath
An autopsy on Robert found that he had ingested a fatal amount of arsenic. Gibbs was arrested for murder on Christmas Day, and the bodies of her husband and three sons were exhumed. Autopsies conducted in the cemetery revealed each of the five murdered members of the Gibbs household had arsenic present in their bodies.

Gibbs initially was found mentally unfit to stand trial and was confined to a mental institution where she worked as a cook. Later, she stood trial and was sentenced to five life sentences. She remained imprisoned until 1999 when she was diagnosed with Parkinson's disease and was released into the custody of her sister. She died in 2010 in a nursing home in Douglasville, Georgia.

See also 
 List of serial killers in the United States

References

 "Janie Gibbs", Mind of a Killer, Kozel Multimedia, 1998
 "Judged Insane in Poisonings," The Associated Press, February 8, 1968
 "Woman Charged in Death of Kin", The Associated Press, January 28, 1968

External links
 Crime Library
 

1932 births
1966 murders in the United States
2010 deaths
20th-century American criminals
American female serial killers
American murderers of children
American people convicted of murder
American prisoners sentenced to life imprisonment
Criminals from Georgia (U.S. state)
Filicides in Georgia (U.S. state)
Mariticides
Murderers for life insurance money
People convicted of murder by Georgia (U.S. state)
People from Cordele, Georgia
People paroled from life sentence
People with Parkinson's disease
Poisoners
Prisoners sentenced to life imprisonment by Georgia (U.S. state)